12 Scorpii is a probable triple star system in the zodiac constellation of Scorpius, located about 300 light years away from the Sun. It has the Bayer designation  c1 Scorpii; 12 Scorpii is the Flamsteed designation. This system is faintly visible to the naked eye with a combined apparent visual magnitude of 5.67. It is a probable (82% chance) member of the Sco OB2 moving group.

The magnitude 5.79 primary component is a B-type main-sequence star with a stellar classification of B9V. This star is 150 million years old with three times the mass of the Sun.

References

B-type main-sequence stars
F-type main-sequence stars
Scorpius (constellation)
Scorpii, 12
Scorpii, c1
Durchmusterung objects
145483
079399
6029